Sam  Campbell is an Australian stand-up comedian and actor. He has won The Barry award at the Melbourne International Comedy Festival, and the main prize at the Edinburgh Comedy Festival.

Career
From Queensland, Campbell both performs stand-up comedy live as well as creating comedy web shows. He made a short series that was broadcast on Comedy Central Australia  and guested on ABC TV’s The Checkout.  In 2015 Campbell won best newcomer award then in 2018 the most outstanding show award, “The Barry”, at the Melbourne International Comedy Festival.

Campbell was the winner of the main prize at the Edinburgh Comedy Awards at the 2022 Edinburgh Fringe Festival with his show simply entitled Comedy Show. It was praised for its originality, surrealism and unexpected jokes by the judges. The show was also well received by The Times who described “a nutball, but he controls his loopiness with deceptive precision” and also said that the show was “exhausting, exhilarating and a touch of genius”. Brian Logan in The Guardian said “Campbell’s imagination produces wonderfully adhesive images.. there is now and then a core of robust observational comedy beneath Campbell’s loopiness.. None of it has anything to do with anything: it’s the incongruity, taken to uncommon lengths, that’s funny.” Logan had previously commented on how Campbell had an “impish and idiosyncratic brand of comedy” and is “a maverick, not a crowd-pleaser; for a long time, indeed, he seemed wilfully to alienate his audience.” Logan highlighted the fact that Campbell’s award-winning show was only performed after midnight and only in the second half of the Edinburgh Fringe which displays an attitude which “signals nonmainstream”. The Daily Telegraph review mentioned “one-liners and absurdist whorls of madcap” delivered  “with a casual, just-passing-the-time insouciance” that means the “amusement motors along so quickly, with such handbrake-turns of tone and for-the-hell-of-it bouts of recircling emphasis, it attains a runaway uncontrollable hilarity.”

In February 2023 Campbell was nominated at the UK National Comedy Awards in the best stand-up category for his show Comedy Show.

Partial filmography

References 

Australian stand-up comedians
Living people
Edinburgh Festival performers
Year of birth missing (living people)